Jordan Holt is the name of:

Jordan Holt (footballer, born 1994), Welsh footballer
Jordan Holt (footballer, born 2000), English footballer